James Ryan (8 February 1887 – 17 July 1957) was a New Zealand rugby union footballer who represented rugby union four times between 1910 and 1914. A soldier in the Otago Infantry Regiment during World War I, he captained the New Zealand Army team in 1919, leading them to success in the King's Cup.

References

1887 births
New Zealand rugby union players
1957 deaths
New Zealand international rugby union players
Rugby union centres
New Zealand military personnel of World War I
Sportspeople from Masterton